Penka Kouneva (/ˈpɛŋkɑː kuːˈnɛvɑː/; born February 25, 1967, in Sofia, Bulgaria) is a Bulgarian-American composer, orchestrator and soundtrack producer. In 1999, she began working in film and television and in 2009 began to score for videogames  (Prince of Persia: The Forgotten Sands and Transformers: Revenge of the Fallen video games, with themes by Steve Jablonsky). Her music is a blend of Bulgarian influences, classical training, rock sensibility, and modern film and game soundtracks.

Kouneva has released two award-winning concept albums: The Woman Astronaut (2015, on Varèse Sarabande / Universal Music Group) and A Warrior's Odyssey (2012, on Howlin’ Wolf Records / Sumthing Else) both receiving 5-star press.

Adolescence and early career (1990–1999) 

Kouneva was born and raised in Sofia, Bulgaria, and began studying piano at the age of six. Her mother was a professor of music theory at the Bulgarian Academy of Music and her father was a scientist at the Institute of Chemical Technologies. At the age of twelve, Kouneva composed and performed incidental music for a children’s theater show that ran for a season. She earned fifteen dollars per show; the official start of her career as a paid composer. Kouneva attended the Sofia High School of Music and achieved a degree in piano. She later enrolled in the National Academy of Music and graduated with a degree in music theory.

In 1990, she was awarded the Mary Duke Biddle Graduate Fellowship to study composition at Duke University, North Carolina, USA.  At Duke she studied composition and orchestration with the American orchestral composers Stephen Jaffe and Scott Lindroth and with the Dutch post-minimalist Louis Andriessen. In 1997, Kouneva received Duke University's first-ever Ph.D. degree in composition in the brand-new doctoral program. In 1997, she also received a Green Card as an “Alien of Extraordinary Abilities.”

Hollywood career (1999 – present) 
In 1999, Kouneva arrived in Los Angeles. Her first mentor was the Emmy-winning composer Patrick Williams whom she met at Duke. She began her career by scoring independent features and thesis films for graduates at the American Film Institute. In 2004, she began to score TV specials and genre telefilms for the SyFy Channel (Chupacabra: Dark Seas, Ice Spiders, Nuclear Hurricane). In 2004, Kouneva met Steve Jablonsky (composer for the Transformers films) and became his orchestrator. She scored video games in 2009 with Ubisoft’s Prince of Persia: The Forgotten Sands and Activision’s Transformers: Revenge Of The Fallen games. For the Transformers game, Kouneva wrote original high-action loops incorporating the musical style that Jablonsky established in the Transformers films – epic orchestra, rousing action melodies and heavy percussion. For the Prince of Persia game, Kouneva composed two hours of original in-game interactive score, fusing inspirations of Persian, Indian and Middle-Eastern music with epic orchestra.

Her credits also include independent features (Primrose Lane, The Third Nail (starring Chloë Grace Moretz), Midnight Movie (starring Brea Grant) as well as in television (Forensic Files, Modern Marvels)). Since 2012, Kouneva has been scoring many independent games (PS4 Medieval game Rollers of the Realm, VR action project Hades, the military shooter H-Hour on Steam and iOS titles IronKill, Black Hole Explorer, Pierre Roux’s Infinite Warrior.)

In addition to composing, Kouneva is a studio orchestrator and has made Hollywood history as the first woman Lead Orchestrator on studio blockbusters since Shirley Walker. (Walker was instrumental for Hans Zimmer, Danny Elfman and others.) Kouneva was Lead Orchestrator on Teenage Mutant Ninja Turtles: Out of the Shadows, Elysium, Ender's Game (films) and Sony's 2015 Game of the Year Bloodborne. Other orchestration credits include the franchises The Matrix, Transformers, Pirates of the Caribbean: At World's End; the games Gears of War 2 & Gears of War 3, World of Warcraft, StarCraft II, Diablo III, Overwatch, Sims, Lord of The Rings: War in the North, and many low-budget independent films and games.

Industry leadership 
Kouneva is on the Advisory Board of Game Developers Conference, the world’s foremost conference for game professionals (2014–present), an Advisor for Sundance Composers Lab (2002–2015) and a Mentor for Game Audio Network Guild (G.A.N.G.) Scholars (2014–current). As a guest artist, she has presented invited lectures and seminars at Duke University, Davidson College, USC, Berklee College of Music, Berklee Valencia, CalArts, The Musicians’ Institute, CSULB and many others. She has also presented at the following conferences: Game Developers Conference (2013, 2014, 2015, 2016), East Coast Game Conference (2012), Power Of Play (2015, 2016), Intel Buzz Workshop London (2016), The Society of Composers and Lyricists (2013), Game Sound Con (2013, 2014, 2015), amongst many other.

Kouneva is profiled in two textbooks (Chance Thomas' “Composing Music For Games” (2016) and Tom Hoover's “Soundtrack Nation” (2011), in a Keynote address (Game Sound Con 2015 Keynote address), in national press and NPR. Additionally, she has been included in two feature-length documentaries: Beep: A Documentary History of Game Sound (2016) and SCORE: A Film Music Documentary (2016).

Mentoring and advocacy 
Kouneva is known for building and training high-performance teams for score production. Amongst her notable protégés are the Hollywood composers and orchestrators Philip Klein, Ben Bromfield, Alexandre Cote, Catherine Grealish, Dallas Aimer, Nicolas Repetto, Steven Melin, Amie Doherty, Fred Emory Smith and many others. Kouneva's arrival to Hollywood was unprepared for the business aspects of entertainment, so she focuses to instructing her protégés to be ready for such challenges. Kouneva’s Composer Career Master Classes are published online by Designing Music Now. Her Gears of War 2 main theme analysis is published by Output.com.

Kouneva is also an advocate for artist growth and for the advancement of women composers. She has led, curated and participated in panels, seminars, and concerts promoting women film and game composers in Los Angeles, at Game Developers Conference, and the Society of Composers and Lyricists.

Philanthropy 
In 2015, Kouneva established and funded an Orchestral Reading for Duke Graduate Composers with the North Carolina Symphony Orchestra. Two graduate composers selected by Duke Music Department will receive a professional reading and recording of their compositions by the nationally recognized symphony orchestra. With this opportunity, she hopes to give a competitive edge to composers as they start their careers.

Personal life 
In 2004 Kouneva married music editor Daniel Schweiger and has one daughter with him,  born in 2006.

Discography 
The lists below show some of Kouneva's most notable work.

Composer

Albums

Film scores

Video games – Composer and Co-composer (selected)

Television – Composer (selected)

Television – Team Composer and Production Music (selected)

Orchestrator

Lead Orchestrator – Film (selected)

Team Orchestrator – Film (selected)

Orchestrator – Video games

References

External links 

 http://goseetalk.com/interview-composer-penka-kouneva-on-the-woman-astronaut/
 http://www.bmi.com/affiliate/C8117
 http://www.crossovermedia.net/artists/penka-kouneva/projects/the-woman-astronaut/
 http://blogs.indiewire.com/womenandhollywood/a-woman-astronaut-life-as-a-woman-composer-in-hollywood
 http://output.com/gears-of-war-main-theme-analysis/
 http://www.aintitcool.com/node/59794
 http://www.soundtracksandtrailermusic.com/2015/07/composer-penka-kouneva-changing-perceptions/
 https://higherplainmusic.com/2015/07/21/penka-kouneva-releases-the-woman-astronaut-behind-the-scenes/
 http://www.gamesauce.biz/2013/04/22/penka-kouneva-on-game-audio-enhancing-the-narrative-experience-the-interactive-design-of-music-and-cinematic-experiences-in-games/
 http://www.gamingangels.com/2011/02/interview-penka-kouneva/
 http://bnr.bg/en/post/100651890/the-woman-astronaut-and-penka-kouneva-a-bulgarian-composer-in-hollywood

Women film score composers
Video game composers
American television composers
1967 births
Bulgarian composers
American film score composers
Musicians from Sofia
American women in electronic music
Living people
20th-century American women musicians
20th-century American composers
20th-century women composers
21st-century American women